Victoria Antoinette Derbyshire is a British journalist, newsreader and broadcaster. Her eponymous current affairs and debate programme was broadcast on BBC Two and the BBC News Channel from 2015 until March 2020. She has also presented Newsnight and BBC Panorama. She was one of eight women to appear in ITV's The Real Full Monty: Ladies Night – an entertainment documentary to raise awareness of breast cancer. She previously presented the morning news, current affairs and interview programme on BBC Radio 5 Live between 10 am and 12 noon each weekday. She left at the same time as fellow 5 Live broadcasters Richard Bacon and Shelagh Fogarty.

Early life
Derbyshire was born in Ramsbottom, Lancashire, to Pauline and Anthony Derbyshire. She attended Bury Grammar School for Girls, an independent school, before studying English language and literature at the University of Liverpool. Afterwards, she attended a postgraduate diploma course in radio and TV journalism at Preston Polytechnic (now the University of Central Lancashire). She has said that her father Anthony physically abused her, her mother, and her younger brother and sister. Derbyshire's mother eventually walked out, leaving with the three children; Victoria was 16 and never saw her father again. She talked about these events during an edition of the BBC's Panorama Derbyshire presented on domestic abuse in lockdown in August 2020. When she was 17, she had a summer job at a furniture factory which she described as the worst job in her life.

Career

Radio
Derbyshire worked as a reporter for BBC Coventry & Warwickshire and later worked for BBC GMR Radio. From the latter, she joined BBC Radio 5 Live in 1998, at first deputizing for Jane Garvey on the breakfast show, and later as the regular co-presenter with Julian Worricker when Garvey moved on. The programme won Gold Sony Awards in 1998 and 2002. In January 2003, Worricker left the breakfast show, and Derbyshire was partnered by Nicky Campbell. After being on maternity leave, she took over the morning news programme in August 2004.

She covered some of the biggest global stories since joining 5 Live: 9/11, the Paris Concorde crash, general elections and the Olympic Games. On TV she has covered the Grenfell Tower fire and the Manchester Arena bombing.

In September 2010, she interviewed her own BBC Radio 5 Live superior about why he was not moving to MediaCityUK in Salford when the station moved in autumn 2011. Describing the interview, The Guardian said: "Derbyshire's grilling of the station's controller Adrian Van Klaveren made Jeremy Paxman's infamous interview with Mark Thompson look like a vicar's tea party." Derbyshire did not move to Salford and often presented from London. In the first three months in MediaCity she had spent only two weeks broadcasting from Salford.

Television
Derbyshire has worked on television news and political programmes including This Week, an interview series, Victoria Derbyshire Interviews.., on the BBC News Channel, and Watchdog, as well as Panorama. She hosted a sports chat show on Channel 4 on Saturday mornings called SportsTalk. She also co-presented the last episode of Central Weekend Live in 2001 

In October 2011, Derbyshire made her debut on Have I Got News for You. In autumn 2013, under the new editorship of Ian Katz, Derbyshire began presenting Newsnight while continuing to present her daily 5 Live programme. Her final Radio 5 Live show was broadcast on 5 September 2014. 

The Victoria Derbyshire current affairs TV programme was her idea; she suggested it to James Harding, then head of BBC News, who commissioned it three days later. It was first broadcast on 7 April 2015 on BBC Two and the BBC News Channel. The programme was cancelled in January 2020; the BBC said that the cost was too high. and it did not attract young and diverse audiences. She was not informed of the decision before the story appeared in The Times. The last programme was broadcast in March 2020. Since then, Derbyshire has presented BBC News at 9 9am-11am on BBC Two, BBC News Channel and BBC World News. She appeared on screen during a Coronavirus lockdown with the telephone number of the National Domestic Abuse hotline written on her hand, to raise awareness of the plight of people that were suffering during the first lockdown due to having to isolate with abusive partners.

In November 2020, it was announced that Derbyshire would be taking part in the twentieth series of I'm a Celebrity...Get Me Out of Here. She was the fourth celebrity to be eliminated alongside Beverley Callard on 30 November. In 2019, she was one of six candidates shortlisted and then auditioned to replace David Dimbleby as the regular host of Question Time.

From September 2022, Derbyshire will become joint lead presenter with Kirsty Wark of BBC's Newsnight.

Awards
In 2009, she won the Nick Clarke Award for her interview with a man accused and then cleared of date rape. 

She was named PinkNews Broadcaster of the Year in October 2015 and 2016. In January 2016 and January 2017, she was nominated for RTS Network Presenter of the Year.

Personal life

Family and relationships
Derbyshire met Mark Sandell at Radio 5 Live and had an affair with him while he was married to fellow 5 Live presenter Fi Glover. After being together for 17 years, Derbyshire and Sandell married in 2018, after Derbyshire was treated for breast cancer; the couple have two children. Her younger brother, Nick Derbyshire, was a county cricketer for Essex and Lancashire between 1994 and 1996.

During the COVID-19 pandemic in 2020, Derbyshire told the Radio Times she would break the rule of six for Christmas to be with her family of seven. She justified her public comment by stating that, "everyone else would be doing it". However she later apologised for her comments.

Health
In August 2015, Derbyshire announced on Twitter that she had been diagnosed with breast cancer and would be having a mastectomy, but would continue to present her programme as often as possible during treatment. She recorded video diaries about her cancer treatment, from her mastectomy through chemotherapy and radiotherapy which went viral and were viewed millions of times.

In 2018 she took part in an ITV programme, The Real Full Monty: Ladies' Night, in which she and seven other women affected by breast cancer encouraged women to check their bodies for signs of the disease.

References

External links
 
 Interview with Bolton Evening News
 

Year of birth missing (living people)
Living people
Alumni of the University of Central Lancashire
Alumni of the University of Liverpool
BBC newsreaders and journalists
BBC Radio 5 Live presenters
British women television journalists
People educated at Bury Grammar School (Girls)
People from Ramsbottom
I'm a Celebrity...Get Me Out of Here! (British TV series) participants